Islam is a minority religion in Punjab, India followed by 535,489 people constituting about 1.93 percent of the state population out of 27.7 million population as of 2011 census report.
 
Islam has a strong historical presence in Punjab with many mosques, mausoleums and shrines. According to the 1941 census, Punjabi Muslims constituted approximately 37.6 percent of the population in the region that comprises the contemporary state of Punjab, India.  With violence and religious cleansing accompanying the partition of India in 1947, the vast majority numbering around 3.71 million departed the region en masse, migrating westward to the region of Punjab that would fall on the western side of the Radcliffe Line, in the contemporary state of Punjab, Pakistan.

In the current era, much of the Muslim population of Punjab consists of migrants from Uttar Pradesh, Haryana, Delhi and Bihar. The native Punjabi Muslims predominantly resides in Malerkotla district and Qadian town.

History

Islam first arrived in the Punjab region following the conquest of Sindh by Muhammad bin Qasim in 712. The first permanent Muslim conquest of the Punjab was carried out by Mahmud Ghaznavi who made the whole of the Punjab a province of his empire with the headquarters at Lahore.

When the Ghaznavid Empire began to decline, the region was conquered by Muhammad Ghori. The conquest by Muhammad Ghori inaugurated a period of Muslim rule which lasted until the 18th century. The Mughals made most of East Punjab a part of the governorate of Sirhind.

The founder of the Ahmadiyya movement, Mirza Ghulam Ahmad, was born in Qadian, East Punjab in 1835.

According to the 1941 census, Muslims constituted approximately 37.5 percent of the population in the region that comprises the contemporary state of Punjab, India, numbering around 3.8 million persons. Following the Partition of Punjab, the population declined to 90,000 or 0.5% due to ethnic cleansing and large-scale mass migration to West Punjab, Pakistan in the violent events of partition of India.

Today, Muslims are scattered across East Punjab with small concentrations in the cities of Chandigarh, Hoshiarpur, Ludhiana, Malerkotla and Qadian. Malerkotla is the only municipality in Indian Punjab that has a Muslim majority. The migrant Uttar Pradeshi Muslims and Bihari Muslims labourers living in industrial city of Ludhiana, Patiala and Jalandhar forms a large proportion of the Muslim population in the state.

Out of 5.35 lakh Muslim population in the state as of 2011 census, only 2.21 lakh Muslims are native and speaks Punjabi as their mother tongue and rest 3.13 lakh speaks Hindustani language mainly Urdu.

Demography

1941 census

2011 census

Trends 
Decadal percentage of Muslims in Punjab, India

See also
 Demographics of Punjab, India
 Religion in the Punjab

Notes

References

 
Punjab, India